Mendota Mdewakanton Dakota Tribal Community is a Dakota community centered in Mendota, Minnesota. The Mendota Mdewakanton Dakota Tribal Community, colloquially known as MMDTC, is an organization who works to continue Dakota cultural practices and tribal organization. Officially formed in 1997, the MMDTC has sought to be a federally recognized tribe by the US Bureau of Indian Affairs, as well as offering community activities such as Pow Wows, Dakota language and culture classes, and partnership with the Minnesota Historical Society.

History 
The Dakota people are the original inhabitants of the land that is now known as Minnesota, specifically centered around the modern day Twin Cities, Mille Lacs Lake, and Minnesota River Valley. The name "Minnesota" comes from the Dakota phrase "Mni Sota," which was used as the name for the Minnesota River and meant "cloudy water," which was then used by settlers as the name for the entire state. The Minnesota River has a strong cultural significance for the Dakota people as the place where it joins the Mississippi River, in Saint Paul, Minnesota, is known as Mdote and holds an island known as Wakan Tanka, which is considered the place that Dakota people were created according to their spirituality. This is close to other important sites to the Dakota people, including Oheyawahi-Pilot Knob and Coldwater Spring.

European Contact 
Before American colonists had made contact with them, Dakota people had lost much of their northern lands in wars with the Ojibwe people, who themselves had been forced westward in conflicts with colonists and had therefore acquired the advantage of guns and ammunition before the Dakota. The first official contact between the Dakota and the United States Government was the 1805 Pike's Treaty, in which the U.S. was able to establish a military fortress, Fort Snelling, and the land that would later be the modern Minneapolis-Saint Paul metropolitan area. This meant the loss of the area around Mdote and Wakan Tanka, and so the heart of the Dakota land. Many treaties were later signed with the U.S., sequestering the Dakota people into smaller plots of land with each successive treaty, culminating in the conflict known as the U.S.-Dakota War.

U.S.-Dakota War of 1862 
The U.S. Dakota war was incited when U.S. officials refused to provide promised food items and goods, leading to widespread starvation and death within the Dakota reservations, particularly along the Minnesota River. Dakota men therefore took up arms against the white settlers around them for their promised food and security, and ultimately their freedom from the colonists. A main figure in this conflict was Taoyateduta (Little Crow), a Dakota chief who greatly assisted in the Dakota resistance and whose descendants figure within the MMDTC. The Dakota were ultimately defeated by the white Minnesotans and noncombatants were then placed in a concentration camp near Fort Snelling, on Wakan Tanka. After trials were held against those Dakota people who participated in the war, President Abraham Lincoln ordered the execution of 38 Dakota men in Mankato, the largest mass execution in U.S. history. Following this, the remainder of the Dakota in the Fort Snelling camp were ordered into exile outside of the state of Minnesota.

Formation 
The Mendota Mdewakanton Dakota Tribal community was officially formed in 1997 in Mendota, Minnesota, the "center of the universe" according to the ancestors of the Dakota. After the U.S.-Dakota War, these families assisted in trying to drive out the Dakota combatants along with other Minnesotans, and so were able to maintain residence near Minneapolis and St. Paul in the towns of Mendota and Lilydale. This allowed them to live near Mdote and Wakan Tanka, and their descendants have retained this space through today.

Highway 55 Re-Route 
Shortly after the formation of the MMDTC, the community was a prominent body in the protest of the re-routing of Highway 55, whose proposed route threatened important Dakota sites such as Coldwater Springs. The Mendota community, along with the American Indian Movement and Earth First!, fought for the Minnesota Department of Transportation to adjust their plans in order to preserve these spaces. After years of protesting, in which the protesters faced violent police raids and winter conditions, and court proceedings, MNDOT consented to install a lining that would protect the water source of the spring, thereby allowing construction of the highway while also protecting the natural habitat.

Federal Recognition 
The Mendota Mdewakanton Dakota Tribal Community has sought federal recognition since its formation in 1997. Initially denied, the community is still fighting for the right to be acknowledged its sovereignty by the U.S. government. The Mendota community is descended from prominent Dakota chiefs, particularly Little Crow, and so is working to be seen as a federally recognized tribe, with the powers and rights that comes with, as it has lineage that connects it to not only Dakota families, but famous ones at that.

Cultural Practices 

The cultural practices of the Mendota Community looks much the same as the broader Dakota peoples, carried down generation by generation from pre-colonial times. The Mendota Community have the distinction of "Keepers of the Eastern Gate," which is the concept that there are tribes at each cardinal direction that defend the Dakota people as a whole. The MMDTC offers monthly tribal meetings, in which the community comes together to make decisions on how they will operate and the activities they will be doing. There is also a yearly Pow Wow around September in which the community and guests celebrate the earth, their ancestors, spirits, and their cultural heritage. The Mendota Community offers classes that educate on the Dakota language, as well as classes on cultural activities such as the making of food. These practices allow for the community to uphold the beliefs and actions of their ancestors, as well as to educate others and to continue these practices for years to come.

References 

American people of Lakota descent